State Highway 196 (SH 196) is a state highway near Wiley, Colorado. SH 196's western terminus is at U.S. Route 50 (US 50) near McClave, and the eastern terminus is at US 287 south of Wiley.

Route description
SH 196 runs , starting at junction with  US 50 near McClave.  The highway goes north past McClave, turns east at CR MM and ends at a junction with  US 287 just south of Wiley.

Major intersections

References

External links

196
Transportation in Bent County, Colorado
Transportation in Prowers County, Colorado